The Zimbabwe National Chamber of Commerce (The Chamber) is a private sector voluntary organization established in 1894 for The Chamber is established for the purpose of developing, promoting, and lobbying for its members and the local business community.

Overview
The Zimbabwe National Chamber of Commerce (ZNCC) is the primary business association in Zimbabwe representing enterprises of every size and kind throughout the country. ZNCC is an independent, voluntary, Non-profit-making organization and Non-political organization.

It is an organization that provides services designed to support its members in Business development. Zimbabwe National Chamber of Commerce is non-profit making membership based organization.

As an independent organization the Zimbabwe National Chamber of Commerce represents the interest of its members through lobbying, collaboration and facilitation.

It provides a focus business empowerment as the engine for Economic growth and also encourages competitiveness in the market place through the promotion of organized business communities.

Companies in Partnership
Zimbabwe Chamber of Commerce is a wing for other companies such as Micro finance houses like Inclusive Financial Services, FMC. As a chamber of Commerce these companies are bound to be in partnership with the ZNCC.

Management

ZNCC is an apolitical, non-profit, membership-based business association which has a mandate to equip business with development opportunities. This achieved through lobbying, business advocacy, economic researches, information dissemination, collaboration and facilitation with all stakeholders, government and regional counterparts in light of economically empowering and resuscitating corporate and industrial Zimbabwe.

The Chamber is driven by a Secretariat through subcommittees, which provide the platform for members to contribute ideas on how the Chamber conducts its business. Currently the active subcommittees of the Chamber are:

Public Relations Subcommittee

 Advocacy Subcommittee
 Macro-Economic Subcommittee
 SME’s Subcommittee
 Finance & Administration Subcommittee
 Women’s Desk Subcommittee
 Trade Subcommittee
 ZNCC is also headed by a presidium which stands as follows:
 Mr Davison Norupiri – President
 Mrs Devine Ndhlukula – Vice President
 Mr. Louis John Herbst - Matabeleland Vice President
 Mr Christopher Mugaga – CEO

Membership

Platinum Membership
Annual Subscriptions $5000

Exclusive Benefits

Personal membership assistance from Chamber staff dedicated to Platinum member
Chamber Events (One free ticket for six (6) events of your choice ( Excluding Annual Congress, Women in Enterprise Conference and Awards (WECA),Business Awards and Business Review Conference)
Discount on, Certification of documents and certificates of origin (Non-members $30)
ZNCC Membership Certificate

1 Annual Presidium Courtesy Call Visit to your Head Offices
Business Development:

Notification of inbound and outbound business development trade missions
Member to Member -program listing to encourage Members to do business with other Members
Workshop and Seminars designed to provide information for improving operations and increasing profit
Business referrals to Member companies
Invitation to participate in specific meetings with government and senior decision makers
Business Partnerships recommendation letter
One Free advertorial in the ZNCC Newsletter per year
Enhanced Visibility:

ZNCC President visit to Russia (14 to 17 January 2019)

ZNCC President Mr Tamuka Macheka was among the delegation to Russia that was led by His Excellency President E. D Mnangagwa. During the Russia Zimbabwe Business Forum, Mr Macheka did a presentation on the overall Business Environment in Zimbabwe and also extended an invitation to the Russian business to invest in Zimbabwe. The forum also consisted of MOU signing ceremony between ZNCC and Chamber of Commerce and Industry of the Russian Federation and the cooperation centered on:

Supporting Trade, investment and economic cooperation between the Russian Federation and the Republic of Zimbabwe through:

Ongoing exchange of data and business information;
Assistance to business delegations exchange;
Promotion of Business contacts between enterprises and entrepreneurs of both countries; and
Promotion of exhibition and fairs events conducted in the Russian Federation and the Republic of Zimbabwe.

ZNCC President- Tamuka Macheka and CCI of Russia President – Sergey Katyrin during the MOU signing ceremony
ZNCC CEO meets World Bank Group (Wednesday 20 March 2019)

Two Senior Economists from the World Bank Group met with the CEO and Economic department on Wednesday 20 March 2019. The agenda of the meeting was to discuss the ZNCC membership and economic challenges that members face, opportunities before them, and support needed, competitive advantage in the sectors they operate, and government support they currently receive or would like to receive. The CEO spoke about membership, activities and support given to ZNCC members. He also mentioned about the great relationship that exists between ZNCC and the World Bank Group. Some of the highlight that came out of the meeting was that challenges being faced by business in Zimbabwe are; unavailability of forex, policy uncertainties’, no clear interest rates in the economy, high cost of doing business among others. The meet also went on to discuss on the current policy issues and what needs to be done to drive the economy to the positive.

ZNCC Activities & Events

2019 Mashonaland Region Annual Business Awards (29 March 2019)

On Friday 29 March 2019, ZNCC Harare Branch successfully held the 2019 Mashonaland Region Awards at Cresta Lodge, Msasa in Harare. The event was graced by Rwandan Ambassador to Zimbabwe His Excellency James Musoni, Hon Minister of Industry and Commerce Mangaliso Ndlovu and senior captains of the industry. The Awards ceremony saw various companies and individual walking away with prestigious awards and these include among others;  Dr Oliver Mtukudzi – Lifetime Achievement Award (posthumously), Cottco – Exporter of the Year and Most improved exporter of the year in the Agriculture Sector, Cassava Smartech – ICT Innovation Award and Sustainability Award,  Eugene Peters of Spidex Media – Young Entrepreneur of the Year, Veronica Gwatiringa of Zimbabwe Garden Seeds – Businesswoman of the Year,  Regis Saruchera of Grant Thornton – Businessman of the Year among others.
 
ZNCC Midlands Chapter on Monetary Policy Statement, State of the Economy and Tax Implications from Fiscal Policy (March 15, 2019)

The Chamber’s Midlands Chapter on March 15, 2019 hosted a business dinner at Gweru’s Suburban Lodge where they deliberated on pertinent issues specified in the Monetary Policy gazetted on the 20th of February 2019 by the Central Bank Governor Dr John Mangudya. Speakers at the event included RBZ and ZIMRA officials who were invited to make presentations and to demystify any business concerns raised by the business community that was in attendance.

ZNCC Vice President Dr T. Manzungu made a presentation on the ZNCC’s perspective on the Monetary Policy and how it was going to impact the business community. In his presentation, he covered a number of issues including establishment of an Inter – Bank Foreign Exchange Market. ZNCC noted the move by the Central Bank as commendable as it allowed the market forces to determine the exchange rate. It also meant that businesses could now make use of the Foreign Exchange Market to acquire foreign currency for importing raw materials for production.

On Local Settlement of Nostro FCA Transfers; ZNCC perceived the development as favourable for business as it made it easy for businesses to transact using foreign currency through formal channels. The move would also help preserve value for businesses given that there is no need to convert foreign currency receipts into RTGS dollars.

RBZ’s presentation highlighted the major objectives of the 2019 Monetary Policy such as the establishment of inter-bank foreign exchange market to restore competitiveness and promote growth; correcting price distortions in the foreign exchange as well as goods markets; as well as aiming to improve export competitiveness through sale of export proceeds at market determined rates.

ZIMRA presentation highlighted a number of fiscal issues such as the Employment Tax Threshold reviewed upwards from $3600 to $4200/ year ($300-$350/month); Tender Tax Clearance issues as well as Transfer Pricing Penalties.

Upcoming Events

Zimbabwe – Belarus Business Delegation (22 – 28 April 2019)

Following the signing of the MOUs between ZNCC and Belarus Chamber of Commerce and Chamber of Commerce of the Russian Federation, ZNCC has been in discussion with the Belarus Chamber of Commerce in connection with Belarus Business Mission to Zimbabwe. The delegation which constitute more than 20 Business Executives will be visiting Zimbabwe from 22 April to 28 April 2019 during the ZITF week. The Belarus delegation will be coming to explore investment opportunities in Zimbabwe and a Zimbabwe-Belarus Business Forum will be held in Bulawayo on Thursday 25 April 2019. The forum will constitute Business to Business meetings. Expected delegates to attend include; government officials; investors, business and diplomatic society; civic society and academia.

2019 ZNCC Annual Congress (26 – 28 June 2019)

The ZNCC 2019 Congress will be held at the Elephant Hills Resort, Victoria Falls, Zimbabwe from 26 - 28 June 2019 under the theme: “Expanding horizons: Dynamic solutions for Economic Turnaround.” We expect our Congress this year to host international delegations from Russia. Other expected delegates to attend this years' Annual Congress include representatives from SADC and 21 member States of COMESA. There will also be a business-to-business (B2B) session; where views on selected economic sectors will be exchanged among delegates. Resolutions emanating from the discussions will be presented as input into policy formulation for improving the business environment to foster economic growth.

ZNCC Mandate
The Chamber is established for the purpose of in developing, promoting, and lobbying for its members and the local business community through :-

 Advancing economic progress through the creation of good climate for business.
 Developing and enhancing business entrepreneurship.
 Identifying, promoting and servicing the interests and needs of the membership
 Representing authoritatively and independently the views of business to local and national authorities.
 Disseminating relevant information to members on local and international markets.
 Collaborating with other national organisational with similar objectives such as trade organisations, sister Chambers, and other BMOs.

See also
 Public Sector Agencies
 Public Sector Organizations
 Nonprofit Organizations
 Companies of Zimbabwe
 Government of Zimbabwe

References

External links
Zimbabwe National Chamber of Commerce - Home
About ZNCC, Zimbabwe Chamber of Commerce - Pindula, Local Knowledge

Business organisations based in Zimbabwe